Frank Ewen Flowers Jr. (born 1979) is a Caymanian independent filmmaker, film director and screenwriter, writer and director of the award-winning 2003 short film Swallow and the 2004 feature motion picture Haven, the latter photographed on the island of Grand Cayman.  Flowers is a graduate of the University of Southern California School of Cinema-Television (now the USC School of Cinematic Arts).

Flowers also co-wrote Metro Manila with director Sean Ellis. The film won an audience award at the Sundance Film Festival and was nominated for a BAFTA in 2014 after winning numerous British Independent Film Awards. He was commissioned in 2015 to script a biopic about the teenage years of basketball legend LeBron James for Universal Studios. The film is being produced by James and his partner Maveric Carter, alongside Academy Award nominees Rachel and Terrance Winter. Flowers is also attached to direct the drama Our Father for Relativity Media and Lantica in the Dominican Republic.

Biography
Frank Ewen Flowers Jr. was born in August 1979 to Frank Sr. and Eve Flowers. He is the grandson of Cayman Islands businessman, Clarence Flowers, a man who rose to commercial wealth from very humble beginnings. Initially, Flowers' family wished for him to go into the family businesses of cement block making, bottled water, real estate and development. Flowers' younger sister, Dara, now understudies her father and two uncles in the gradual preparation to hand over the group of companies to the third generation of Flowers. Since the production of his feature film HAVEN, his family has been outspoken in their support of his career.

External links

About: Hollywood Movies – Exclusive Interview with Haven Writer/Director Frank E Flowers  by Rebecca Murray
Bahama News Archive – Frank E. Flowers: Bahamas International Film Festival fundraiser features the work of this emerging Caribbean filmmaker by Matt Cromwell
Flowers Conducts School Workgroups *
 Official Site
 LeBron James Movie

American film directors
American male screenwriters
Caymanian emigrants to the United States
1979 births
Living people
USC School of Cinematic Arts alumni